XMC may refer to:
 Cessna XMC, a technology demonstrator aircraft
 Infineon XMC, a series of microcontrollers
 Makhuwa-Marrevone language, a Bantu language of Mozambique
 Mallacoota Airport, a public airport in Mallacoota, Victoria, Australia
 XBMC, a media player application originally known as Xbox Media Center
  Switched Mezzanine Card, a type of PCI Mezzanine Card